Ceramic petrography (or ceramic petrology) is a laboratory-based scientific archaeological technique that examines the mineralogical and microstructural composition of ceramics and other inorganic materials under the polarised light microscope in order to interpret aspects of the provenance and technology of artefacts.

Samples are ground to a thickness of 0.03 mm and mounted on a glass slide. The approach relies heavily on the geological principles of optical mineralogy, thin section petrography and soil micromorphology. It combines these with an appreciation of the craft of ceramic manufacture and interprets data within an archaeological framework.

Ceramic petrography is used in academic archaeological research and commercial archaeology to address a range of issues. A common goal is tracing the movement of pottery and associated trade through provenance determination. The principle of provenance ascription with ceramic petrography relies on the fact that "the mineral and rock inclusions within a paste are a reflection of the geology of the source area of the ceramics" and that potters did not transport ceramic raw materials over significant distances.

An equally important concern is the nature of ancient ceramic production and its meaning in terms of the knowledge, skills, identity and traditions of potters. As synthetic materials, ceramics are "sensitive indicators of human decision making and materials interaction". By examining microstructural evidence for processes such as clay paste preparation, forming and firing, ceramic petrographers can reconstruct the steps involved in the production of ceramic artefacts.

Ceramic petrography originated in the American Southwest with the work of Anna O. Shepard but has mainly been developed in the Old World in the later half of the 20th century. Other early studies include the work of David Peacock and his students in the UK

Ceramic petrography continues to be applied to the interpretation of British ceramics and is used heavily in the prehistoric Aegean. In the USA the approach is less popular, though important contributions have been made in the area of quantitative petrography. Other attempts to extend ceramic petrography include the use of automated image analysis, the palaeontological analysis of microscopic fossils within ceramic thin sections and the combined statistical classification of petrographic and chemical data from artefacts.

Thin section archaeological petrography can be applied to a range of other artefact types in addition to ceramics; these include plaster, mortar, mudbricks and lithic implements. It was also used for provenance and technology studies of the Amarna letters, as well as cuneiform tablets from the archives of Hattusa and the Southern Levant.

Academic papers on ceramic petrography are often published in journals such as Archaeometry, Journal of Archaeological Science and Geoarchaeology, as well as edited volumes. Petrographic research is often presented at the International Symposium on Archaeometry, the European Meeting on Ancient Ceramics and the meetings of the Ceramic Petrology Group.

References

Methods in archaeology